The 2012 New Zealand Television Awards were the new name of the New Zealand television industry awards, following the demise of the Aotearoa Film and Television Awards. The awards were held on Saturday 3 November at The Great Room of the Langham hotel in Auckland, New Zealand, with highlights screening on TV ONE on Sunday 4 November. The New Zealand Television Awards took a similar format to the previous Qantas Television Awards, honouring excellence in New Zealand television and television journalism. This was the final New Zealand television awards presentation organised by Think TV, after Television New Zealand withdrew its support in 2013.

Nominees and winners 

There are 46 categories, including the new categories for One-Off Drama and Breaking News. Finalists were announced on 26 September 2012. Entries cover the broadcast period of 1 August 2011 to 15 July 2012. The general television awards were dominated by true crime drama Siege, with five awards, while the news and current affairs section was dominated by TV3, with eight awards.

News and current affairs 

Best Scheduled News Programme
 3 News
 ONE News	
 Tonight	

Best Coverage Breaking News	
 ONE News, Caterton Ballooning Tragedy 3 News, Christchurch Earthquakes December 2011
 3 News, Ewen Macdonald VerdictBest News OR Current Affairs Presenter	
 Julian Wilcox, Native Affairs
 Mike McRoberts, 3 News
 John Campbell, Campbell Live

Best News Reporting
 Duncan Garner & Patrick Gower, 3 News
 Amanda Gillies, 3 News
 Heather du Plessis-Allan, ONE News

Best Current Affairs Reporting for a Weekly Programme OR One-Off Current Affairs Special
 Mark Crysell & Julie Clothier, Sunday
 Melanie Reid, 60 Minutes
 Janet McIntyre, Max Adams & Chris Cooke, Sunday
 Janet McIntyre & Carolyne Meng-Yee, Sunday

Best Current Affairs Reporting for a Daily Programme
 Gill Higgins & Chris Lynch, Close Up
 Tristram Clayton, Campbell Live
 John Campbell, Campbell Live

Best Current Affairs Series
 60 Minutes	
 Campbell Live
 Sunday

Investigation of the Year	
 Melanie Reid & Eugene Bingham, 60 Minutes "The Eye of the Storm"
 John Hudson & Chris Cooke, Sunday, "Steel Trap"
 John Campbell and Pip Keane, Campbell Live, "Friends: John Banks & Kim Dotcom"

Journalist of the Year – Finalists are the winners of the four reporting categories
 Melanie Reid, "The Eye of the Storm", 60 Minutes
 Duncan Garner, "Secret Tea Tapes", 3 News
 Julie Clothier, "Cherry Blossom Tragedy", Sunday
 Gill Higgins, "Online Predators", Close Up

Best News Camera
 Phil Johnson, 3 News
 Bob Grieve, 3 News
 James Marshall, ONE News

Best Current Affairs Camera
 Daniel Grade, 60 Minutes
 Chris Brown, 20/20
 Warren Armstrong, Campbell Live

Best News Editing
 Luis Portillo, Breakfast
 Brent Walters, ONE News
 Rebecca O'Sullivan, 3 News

Best Current Affairs Editing
 Bob Grieve, 60 Minutes
 Paul Sparkes, Close Up
 Andrew Gibb, Close Up

Best Graphics
 Vinay Ranchhod, "Devil in the Detail" (TV ONE)
 Vinay Ranchhod, Gambling RP (TV ONE)
 *Ben Ashby, Steel Trap (TV ONE)

General television 

Best Drama Series
 Go Girls, Season 4, South Pacific Pictures Underbelly NZ: Land Of The Long Green Cloud, Screentime NZ Ltd
 Nothing Trivial, South Pacific PicturesBest One-Off Drama Siege, Screentime NZ Ltd BLISS – the beginning of Katherine Mansfield, MF Films
 Rage, Tom Scott ProductionsBest Comedy OR Comedy Series Hounds, The Down Low Concept 7 Days	MediaWorks / The Down Low Concept
 Wilson Dixon: The New Zealand Tour, Satellite MediaBest Māori Language Programme Whare Taonga, Scottie Productions Limited Kia Ora Molweni, George Andrews Productions
 Tamaki Paenga Hira, Māori TelevisionBest Presenter: Te Reo Māori Julian Wilcox, Native Affairs Pānia Papa, AKO
 Piripi Taylor Te KaeaBest Children’s/Youth Programme Let's Get Inventin', Luke Nola Girl vs. Boy, KHF Media
 The Erin Simpson Show, Whitebait TVBest Information Series Global Radar, Jam TV Neighbourhood, Satellite Media
 The Nutters Club, Top Shelf ProductionsBest Entertainment OR Event Programme Vodafone NZ Music Awards 2011, MediaWorks 2012 Comedy Gala	MediaWorks
 The Sitting, Top Shelf ProductionsBest Factual Series Radar Across the Pacific, Alexander Behse / Zeitgeist Productions Intrepid Journeys, Jam TV
 Funny Roots, Two HeadsBest Observational Reality Series SPCA Rescue, "Christchurch Earthquake Special", Imagination Television Songs From the Inside, Awa Films Ltd
 Rescue 1, Great Southern TelevisionBest Constructed Reality Series The Food Truck, Two Heads Missing Pieces, Eyeworks New Zealand
 Marae DIY, Screentime NZ LtdBest Performance by an Actress Sara Wiseman, What Really Happened: Votes for Women
 Kate Elliott, BLISS – the beginning of Katherine Mansfield
 Amanda Billing, Shortland Street

Best Performance by a Supporting Actress
 Miriama Smith, Siege
 Miranda Harcourt, Tangiwai – A Love Story
 Sarah Pierse, BLISS – the beginning of Katherine Mansfield

Best Performance by an Actor	
 Mark Mitchinson, Siege
 Craig Parker, Shackleton's Captain
 Ryan O'Kane, Rage

Best Performance by a Supporting Actor
 Mick Rose, Tangiwai – A Love Story
 Peter Elliott, BLISS – the beginning of Katherine Mansfield
 Mike Minogue, Rage

Best Presenter – Entertainment/Factual
 Matai Smith, Homai Te Pakipaki
 Andrew Lumsden, Global Radar
 Paul Henry, Would I Lie To You?

Best Script – Drama/Comedy
 John Banas, Siege
 Paula Boock & Donna Malane, Tangiwai – A Love Story
 Tom Scott and Grant O'Fee, Rage

Best Director – Drama/Comedy
 Fiona Samuel, BLISS – the beginning of Katherine Mansfield
 Mike Smith, Siege
 Danny Mulheron, Rage

Best Director – Entertainment/Factual
 Julie Christie, The Block NZ
 Peter Young, Get Fresh with Al Brown
 Mike Smith, Underbelly NZ: Land Of The Long Green Cloud

Best Multi-camera Direction
 Mitchell Hawkes, Vodafone NZ Music Awards 2011
 Robert Hagen, Dame Kiri Te Kanawa: A Gala Concert
 Mitchell Hawkes, Wilson Dixon: The New Zealand Tour

Best Cinematography Drama/Comedy
 David Paul, Tangiwai – A Love Story
 DJ Stipsen, Siege
 David Paul, Rage

Images & Sound Best Editing Drama/Comedy
 Margot Francis, BLISS – the beginning of Katherine Mansfield
 Margot Francis, Siege
 Jono Woodford Robinson, Rage

Best Original Music	
 Don McGlashan, BLISS – the beginning of Katherine Mansfield
 Joel Haines, Strongman – The Tragedy
 Peter Hobbs, Tangiwai – A Love Story

Best Sound Design
 Chris Burt, Siege
 Dick Reade, Strongman – The Tragedy
 Phil Burton, Chris Hiles, Don Paulin, Tangiwai – A Love Story

Best Production Design
 John Harding, Tangiwai – A Love Story
 Images & Sound, Shackleton's Captain
 Tracey Collins, BLISS – the beginning of Katherine Mansfield

Best Costume Design
 Sarah Voon Go Girls, season 4
 Nic Smillie, Tangiwai – A Love Story
 Kirsty Cameron, BLISS – the beginning of Katherine Mansfield

Best Make-Up Design
 Linda Wall, Tangiwai – A Love Story
 Tracey Sharman, Strongman – The Tragedy
 Vanessa Hurley & Stefan Knight, Go Girls, season 4

Documentary 

Best Popular Documentary	
 The Green Chain, Meg Douglas & Kathleen Mantel / Scottie Productions Limited Rhodes, Actor Singer, Robert Hagen / Arts and Entertainment Productions
 Inside Child Poverty, Red Sky Film & Television LtdBest Feature OR Drama Documentary	
 Strongman – The Tragedy, Paula McTaggart and Gaylene Preston / A Bigger Picture When a City Falls – the people's story, Gerard Smyth & Alice Shannon / Frank Film
 Shackleton's Captain, James Heyward & Andy Salek / Making MoviesBest Director Documentary	
 Gerard Smyth/Alice Shannon, When a City Falls – the people's story
 Leanne Pooley, Shackleton's Captain
 Bryan Bruce, Inside Child Poverty

Best Cinematography – Documentary/Factual	
 Simon Baumfield, Shackleton's Captain
 Thomas Burstyn CSC & Chris Brokensha, Strongman – The Tragedy
 Mark Chamberlin, Neighbourhood

Best Editing – Documentary/Factual	
 Ken Sparks, Richard Lord, When a City Falls – the people's story
 Tim Woodhouse, Shackleton's Captain
 Mark Albiston, Blakey

References

New Zealand television awards
Television awards
New Zealand
Awards
2010s in New Zealand cinema